Merlwood is a rural locality in the South Burnett Region, Queensland, Australia.

History 
Merlwood State School opened on 23 March 1910 under teacher Alice Amelia Wilson. It closed on 22 January 1967.  It was located on the north-west corner of Pringle Hill Road and Eisenmengers Road, just north of the Gayndah Road.

A Methodist church was built in 1913 on the corner of the crossroads opposite the state school.  The building was later removed.  This church was strongly supported by a prominent local family who were among the first settlers, the Shelton family.

A cemetery is believed to have existed in the very earliest days of settlement in the eastern part of Merlwood near Richards Road.  It is unknown what has become of this cemetery or even if the exact location is known.

References 

South Burnett Region
Localities in Queensland